The Right to Remain Silent is a play by Mark Fauser and Brent Briscoe that was adapted for a television film in 1996 starring Robert Loggia and Lea Thompson.

Synopsis
It was supposed to be just a normal night at the police station for rookie cop Christine Paley (Thompson). This is a report of about eight different types of arrests which can happen in a normal month. Lt. Mike Brosloe (Loggia) leads her through one of the most unusual first shifts.

Main cast
Robert Loggia as Mike Brosloe
Lea Thompson as Christine Paley
LL Cool J as Charles Red Taylor
Amanda Plummer as Paulina Marcos
Christopher Lloyd as Johnny Benjamin
Laura San Giacomo as Nicole Savita
Fisher Stevens as Dale Myerson
Judge Reinhold as Buford Lowry
Patrick Dempsey as Tom Harris
Carl Reiner as Norman Friedler

Awards
Nominated for two Cable Ace Awards, the film won one.

External links

The Right to Remain Silent at Markfauser.com 

1996 films
1996 television films
1996 comedy films
American comedy television films
Films produced by John McTiernan
1990s English-language films
1990s American films